The Manix Formation is a geologic formation in California. It preserves fossils.

See also

 List of fossiliferous stratigraphic units in California
 Paleontology in California

References

External links
 

Geologic formations of California